Cynoglossus abbreviatus, commonly known as the three-lined tongue sole, is a species of tonguefish. It is indigenous to the coast of the South China Sea, commonly found in shallow muddy or sandy waters along the coast of China, Taiwan, Korea and Japan.

References

External links
 Fishbase

Cynoglossidae
Fish described in 1834
Taxa named by John Edward Gray